Bradford City Radio or BCR as it was also known, was a small radio station in the early 1990s. It used the old Pennine Radio frequency of 103.2 FM to broadcast and was one of the Independent Broadcasting Authority's incremental stations.

Broadcasting mainly to the region's ethnic minority communities, Bradford City Radio Ltd trading as SUNRISE RADIO (Yorkshire), was formally launched on 9 December 1989 from studios based in Little Germany, just two minutes walk from Pennine Radio itself.

The frequency is now used to broadcast a local version of Sunrise Radio called Sunrise Radio (Yorkshire).

References 

Defunct radio stations in the United Kingdom
Mass media in Bradford
Radio stations in Yorkshire